The Bulletin of the American Schools of Oriental Research is one of three academic journals published by the American Schools of Oriental Research. It began as the Bulletin of the American School of Oriental Research in Jerusalem, in 1919.  The Bulletin took on its current name in 1921.

References

External links

JSTOR Early Journal Content, at the Internet Archive:
Partial archive, 1919 - 1921
Partial archive, 1922 - 1923

Religious studies journals
Ancient Near East journals
Publications established in 1919
Biannual journals